Private Revolution is the debut album by the British rock band World Party.  At this point, singer-songwriter/multi-instrumentalist Karl Wallinger was the only member of World Party, and the only person pictured on the cover.

Wallinger is assisted on this album by several session musicians, including Anthony Thistlethwaite, Steve Wickham and Sinéad O'Connor. Several other musicians listed in the credits are actually whimsically named pseudonyms for Wallinger himself.

Track listing 

All songs written by Karl Wallinger except "Dance of the Hoppy Lads", written by Wallinger with Stephen Wickham, and "All I Really Want to Do", written by Bob Dylan.

 "Private Revolution" (4:01)
 "Making Love (To the World)" (2:30)
 "Ship of Fools" (4:27)
 "All Come True" (5:52)
 "Dance of the Hoppy Lads" (0:44)
 "It Can Be Beautiful (Sometimes)" (3:00)
 "The Ballad of the Little Man" (5:02)
 "Hawaiian Island World" (4:20)
 "All I Really Want to Do" (4:43)
 "World Party" (4:36)
 "It's All Mine" (5:33)

Personnel
World Party
Karl Wallinger — vocals, guitars, bass, sampling keyboards, drum programming
with:
Delahaye — drums, percussion (possibly a pseudonym for Wallinger, or for Mike Scott - this is an alias also used on several Waterboys albums)
Rufus Dove — guitars (probably a pseudonym for Wallinger - pun on "rufous dove")
Martin Finnucane — harp ("Dance of the Hoppy Lads") (probably a pseudonym for Wallinger - this is the name of a character in the Flann O'Brien novel The Third Policeman)
Ahmed Gottlieb — sitar and tabla (probably a pseudonym for Wallinger)
Millennium Mills — piano (probably a pseudonym for Wallinger - name taken from Millennium Mills building in London Docklands)
Sinéad O'Connor — backing vocals ("Private Revolution", "Hawaiian Island World")
Anthony Thistlethwaite — saxophone ("Ship of Fools")
Will Towyn — sampling keyboards (probably a pseudonym for Wallinger - pun on "will to win")
Steve Wickham — violin

Charts

References 

World Party albums
1987 debut albums
Chrysalis Records albums